Ned Kelly is a 2003 Australian bushranger film based on Robert Drewe's 1991 novel Our Sunshine. Directed by Gregor Jordan, the film's adapted screenplay was written by John Michael McDonagh. The film dramatises the life of Ned Kelly, a legendary bushranger and outlaw who was active mostly in Victoria, the colony of his birth. In the film, Kelly, his brother Dan, and two other associates—Steve Hart and Joe Byrne—form a gang of Irish Australians in response to Irish and English tensions that arose in 19th century Australia. Heath Ledger stars in the title role, with Orlando Bloom, Naomi Watts and Geoffrey Rush. The film received mixed reviews from critics and grossed $6 million worldwide.

Plot
After saving a young boy from drowning and being awarded a "hero sash" when he was himself a 10-year-old, Ned Kelly grows up in the British colony of Victoria where he was born. The son of a Catholic Irish settler, he lives with his widowed mother Ellen, his younger brother Dan, and his two younger sisters Kate and Grace. Ned's best friend Joe and Dan's best friend Steve are also often at the house. One day in 1871, when he is 17 years old, he sees a white mare grazing alone in the outback. He rides it into town to impress a local girl named Jane, only to be arrested and subsequently imprisoned for supposedly stealing the horse, even though it had actually been stolen by an acquaintance of his, Wild Wright.

He is released and comes home three years later, and starts helping his family with their small horse-breeding farm located near Beechworth. He takes vengeance on Wild Wright by beating him in a prizefight, and befriends Julia Cook, the beautiful wife of an English land owner who lives nearby. One night at a bar, a local constable named Fitzpatrick is abusively courting Kate. Ned intervenes and hostilities erupt with Fitzpatrick and his fellow officers. To get back at Ned, they take the Kellys' horses, but with the help of his brother and their friends, Ned steals them back. Some nights later, while Ned and Julia are consummating their blossoming passion in the Cooks' stables, Fitzpatrick shows up at the Kelly farm and asks to see Kate; when she once more rejects him, he tries to arrest Dan for horse stealing, invoking non-existent warrants for him and Ned. A fight ensues and Fitzpatrick is wounded, and falsely reports that it's Ned Kelly who shot him. In retaliation, the police arrest Ned's mother.

Ned asks Julia to testify he was with her the night Fitzpatrick was at the Kelly's farm, but she refuses, saying that she would be disgraced by the public acknowledgement of their affair and her husband would take her children away. Ned, Dan, Joe and Steve become outlaws on the run. They later meet a patrol in the bushland and kill three officers in a shoot-out, despite Ned's efforts to have nobody get hurt. During the following months the "Kelly Gang" avoids capture, living in the outback, often without food. On one occasion, Julia gives them shelter at her farm while her husband is away.

A large bounty is placed on their heads, and a decree is passed that allows anybody to shoot them on sight without consequences. They rob two English banks and burn the mortgage documents with which the Crown is starving the selectors. They give the money from their robberies to poor families in need, and soon become acclaimed as folk heroes by the Victorian population as much as the media depict them as violent criminals. To solve a situation in danger of escalating into widespread revolt, the Colonial Government sends in stern Superintendent Francis Hare, who arrests many sympathizers including Joe's childhood friend Aaron. Being promised they won't harm Joe, but only the Kellys, Aaron agrees to work as an informant. During a quick visit back into Beechworth, Joe learns Aaron has been seen talking with cops, so the gang decide to feed him false information about their next heist, to test his loyalty. When they see a large group of constables heading to the bank Aaron was told about, they know Aaron betrayed them, and Joe kills him at his house.

Ned devises a plan to foil Superintendent Hare. The gang lures him in by taking over the town of Glenrowan. They gather everybody the townspeople, most of whom are friendly to their causes, at the Glenrowan Inn, to better protect them in the upcoming fight. In the meantime, they sabotage the railroad tracks leading into town, to derail the train on which Hare and his army of constables are travelling. They've also built metal helmets and plates of body armour to survive bullets. They count on the derailment to kill most of them constables, planning to then capture Hare and exchange him for Ned and Dan's mother. Unfortunately, an escaped hostage stops the train in time to avoid the incident. Hundreds of officers lay siege to the inn late at night. Determined to go out in a blaze of glory, the Kelly Gang emerge from the inn and begin shooting, protected by their armour, but are forced inside again. The police once again raid the inn, killing innocent civilians during the shoot-out. To buy the time needed for the townspeople to flee from the back, Ned exits and charges forward alone; he is ultimately shot in the arms and legs and falls out of sight. Near dawn, Joe is shot and dies inside the inn. Dan and Steve, down to their last bullets and knowing all is lost, commit suicide. Ned regains consciousness and even though gravely injured, continues to fire at the police. He is finally shot to the ground and taken down. Ned is loaded onto the train to be brought back and face justice; Hare asks if he may have his beloved green-and-gold sash, which he's still wearing 15 years after he saved the drowning child.

In the end, even with a petition of over 32,000 signatures strong asking for a pardon, Kelly is hanged at Old Melbourne Gaol on 11 November 1880.

Cast

Production

Principal photography started on 29 April 2002, Most of the filming was done at the Little River Earth Sanctuary, Mount Rothwell, near Geelong. Street scenes were filmed in Clunes and Ballarat. Other locations include Broadford, Glenfern House in St Kilda East, Hepburn Springs and Melbourne.

Soundtrack 

The album Ned Kelly – Music from the Motion Picture was released on Decca Records on 6 April 2003. Film score by Klaus Badelt. Bernard Fanning sings "Shelter for My Soul", and "Moreton Bay".

Reception
In total, the film grossed $5,040,860 internationally, $86,959 in the United States and $6,585,516 worldwide. The film received mixed reviews, with a 56% Fresh rating on Rotten Tomatoes, with an average rating of 5.7/10 based on 54 reviews. The critical consensus states that "More depth about the legendary outlaw would be welcome, but as it is, Ned Kelly is a reasonably entertaining Western." A review of the film comments "Heath Ledger gives a solid performance in the lead but Orlando Bloom and Geoffrey Rush are woefully underused." BBC film reviewer Nev Pierce gave the film 3 out of 5 stars, stating "there is some impressive action, albeit great scenes rather than sequences", concluding with "a rousing, watchable western". Jay Richardson from FutureMovies.co.uk stated "this is a competent and blandly enjoyable film with a solid central performance from Heath Ledger". Megan Spencer from ABC.net said "Thankfully Ned Kelly is a very cinematic Australian film, the international and local cast and crew made the most of their $30 million budget. And some of the best sequences are due in part to Heath Ledger's well delivered internal dialogue voice over, giving an inner life to the musings of a troubled anti-hero". Clint Morris, a reviewer from Film Threat, who gave the film 3 and half stars out of 5, said "It's an exciting movie filled with plenty of action, adventure, beautiful cinematography and best of all, terrific performances" while praising Ledger: "Heath Ledger is fantastic as Kelly. He gives a very immersing performance, and has misshapen himself into the character. When he wears that infamous tin helmet in the finale, we actually feel that's the real deal." More critically, one review describes the battle for Glenrowan, with masses of police and civilian casualties, along with a lion and monkey as "fictional nonsense".

Awards and nominations

See also
Cultural depictions of Ned Kelly

References

External links

 
 
 
 
 Ned Kelly at Metacritic
 
 Ned Kelly at Oz Movies

2003 films
2003 Western (genre) films
Australian biographical drama films
Films based on biographies
Focus Features films
StudioCanal films
Working Title Films films
Films set in Victoria (Australia)
Films directed by Gregor Jordan
Films produced by Nelson Woss
2003 biographical drama films
Films set in colonial Australia
Films scored by Klaus Badelt
Bushranger films
Films about bank robbery
Cultural depictions of Ned Kelly
Films set in the 19th century
Films set in the 1870s
Films set in 1871
Films set in 1880
Films set on trains
2003 drama films
Films set in Melbourne
2000s English-language films